Rudge may refer to:

Places
Rudge, Shropshire, England
Rudge, Somerset, England
Rugde (Kristiansand), a neighbourhood in Kristiansand, Norway

People
Anne Rudge (1761–1836), English botanist
Antonietta Rudge (1885–1974), Brazilian pianist
Dale Rudge (born 1963), English footballer
Daniel Rudge (1840–1880), English engineer
Edward Rudge (1763–1846), English botanist and antiquary
Humphrey Rudge (born 1977), Dutch footballer
John Rudge (born 1944), English footballer and football manager
John Arthur Roebuck Rudge (1837–1903), English cinema pioneer
Lloyd Rudge (1934–1990), English cricketer
Myles Rudge (1926–2007), English songwriter
Olga Rudge (1895–1996), American violinist
Rudge Sisters (19th century), British actresses-dancers
Will Rudge (born 1983), English cricketer

Other uses
The Rudge Cup, found at the site of a Roman villa in Wiltshire, England
Rudge-Whitworth, a British motorcycle, wheel and automobile manufacturer
Barnaby Rudge, a novel by Charles Dickens